Cadmus N. Bray House is a historic house located at 229 West Second Street in Siler City, Chatham County, North Carolina. James W. Turner, a local builder, constructed the house, and it remains a nearly unaltered representative of early 20th century architectural preferences in a small North Carolina rail town.

Description and history 
The -story, Queen Anne/Colonial Revival style timber-framed residence was built in 1906 for Siler City businessman and town mayor, Cadmus Bray. It features multiple bay projections covered by a steeply pitched and cross-gabled hipped roof surmounted by a square frame balustrade and a wraparound porch.

It was listed on the National Register of Historic Places on December 30, 1999.

References

Houses on the National Register of Historic Places in North Carolina
Queen Anne architecture in North Carolina
Colonial Revival architecture in North Carolina
Houses completed in 1906
Houses in Chatham County, North Carolina
National Register of Historic Places in Chatham County, North Carolina
1906 establishments in North Carolina